Makbula Manzoor or Mokbula Manzoor (1938–2020) was a Bangladeshi author and novelist. Her literary works are considered to have played a significant role in the creation of modern Bangladeshi literature.  Author Syedur Rahman cites her together with Akhtaruzzaman Ilias, Selina Hossain and Hasan Hafizur Rahman as one of the notable contributors to modern Bangladeshi literature.

Makbula Manzoor is noted for writing from a woman's perspective in a male-dominated society; her 1998 novel Kaler Mandira is one such example, and references female exploitation during the Bangladesh Liberation War in 1971. She is considered to be an outstanding Bangladeshi female writer, inspired by the events which led to the creation of the country in 1971. Makbula is renowned for her novels, short stories and articles. A superb story-teller, Makbula has skillfully portrayed the socio-political history of Bangladesh and the endless struggle of ordinary men and women. She dedicated her writing to both children and adolescents, as well as adult fiction. Makbula received many national awards in recognition of her contribution to Bengali literature.

As a professor of Bengali literature, Makbula taught generations of students.

Early life and education
Makbula Manzoor was born on 14 September 1938 in the city of Kalna, Bardhaman district, where her father was stationed as a Police Officer. Bardhaman was situated in the undivided India, now located in West Bengal.

Makbula spent most of her childhood years amongst the lush green fields, rivers and open skies of northern Bengal.  

The nature of her father's police duties required the family to move throughout northern Bengal; across the Bogra, Pabna and Dinajpur districts. As a consequence of her father's various postings, Makbula attended many schools.

Makbula's early schooling took place across northern Bengal. She matriculated from Bindubasini Girls’ High School in Tangail. Later, she completed her higher secondary schooling at Rajshahi College.

Makbula completed her Bachelor of Arts degree from Eden Girls College. She obtained her master's degree in Bangla Literature at the University of Dhaka.

Career

Language Movement to Liberation War 
Makbula Manzoor always maintained a strong cultural bond and political consciousness. She was active leading up to, during and following the Liberation War. Her experiences are reflected in many of her works, most notably in her novel Kaler Mondira (Cymbal of Time) where she documents the torture inflicted on the women of Bangladesh by Pakistani forces.

In February 1952, as a student in Tangail district, Makbula organised a group of fellow students to join a rally in solidarity with students in Dhaka shot and killed by the police. Those students were protesting against the West Pakistani politicians’ decision to reject Bangla and make Urdu the state language. Makbula and her fellow students kicked open the hostel gate and joined the rally. This rebellious act resulted in an arrest warrant being issued for Makbula, and her suspension from the school.

Whilst a teacher in 1971, she was barred from hoisting the flag of Bangladesh which prompted her decision to leave the school.

Literary life 
Makbula wrote one of her first poems at the tender age of eight which was published in Mukul Mahfil, the children's section of daily Azad. Through to her teenage years she wrote poems and some short stories but was later encouraged to focus on her fiction by the eminent artist Quamrul Hasan.

Whilst a Bachelor of Arts student, Makbula published her first novel Akash Kanya (Daughter of the Sky) which was serialised in the weekly Begum. Her first book Aar Ek Jiban (Another Life) was completed prior to finishing her master's degree. She adapted many of her stories into television and radio dramas. Makbula received many national awards in recognition of her contribution to Bengali literature. Her teenage fiction Danpite Chele (The Cheeky Boy) was made into a movie which won the National Film Award and Tashkent International Film Festival award in 1980.

Works

Adult fiction 
 Ar Ek Jiban (Another Life, 1968)
 Abasanna Gan (Tired Song,1982)
 Baishakhe Shirna Nadi (The River Shrunk in Baishakh, 1983)
 Shayanno Juthika (The Evening Jasmine 1993)
 Jal  Rang Chabi  (Watercolour  Painting, 1984)
 Atmaja O  Amra (Sons and Ourselves, 1988)
 Patita  Prithibi (The Fallen  Earth, 1989)
 Prem Ek Sonali Nadi (Love: A Golden River, 1989)
 Shiyare  Niyata Surja (The Perpetual Sun over the Lying  Head, 1989);
 Achena Nakshatra (The Unknown  Star, 1990)
 Kone Dekha Alo (Light for Observing the Bride, 1991)
 Nirbacita Premer Upanyas (Selected romantic novels, 1992);
 Nadite Andhakar  (Darkness on the River, 1996)
 LilaKamal (Toy Lotus, 1996)
 Kaler Mandira 1st Ed. (Cymbal of Time, Autobiographical novel 1997)
 Baul Batash   (2001) Uttorbongo Publications
 Chaya Pothe Dekha (2002) Oitijjhya Publications
 Ektai Jeebon (2004) Shobha Publications
 Kaler Mondira 2nd Ed. (Cymbal of Time, Autobiographical novel 2004) Jonaki Prokashoni
 Matri Rheen  (2004) Al-Mahdi Publications

Children's books 
 Danpite Chele (Teenage Fiction) 1980  Bangladesh Children's Academy
 Chotoder Mahmuda Khatun Siddiqua 1983  (Biography for Children) Islamic Foundation
 Shahoshi Chele (Children's fiction)  1990 Srijon Prokashoni
 Akash Bhora Gaan (Children's fiction)  1996 Bangladesh Children's Academy
 Shopner Golap 2000 (Selected  Children's short stories) Uttorbongo Prokashoni
 Shonar Jhapi (Teenage Fiction) 2001  Gonoprakashani
 Boner Pakhi Chandana (Selected  children's short Stories) 2004 Gonoprakashani
 Deshe Deshe (Travelogue) 2005  Bangladesh Children's Academy
 Kishor Shomogro (Selected teenage  novels and short stories) 2005 Al-Mahdi Publications
 Gramer Naam Phultoli (Teenage  Fiction)2006 Gonoprakashani
 Shurjo Kishor 2006 (Selected folk and fairy tales) Shobha Prokash 
 Chotoder Mahabharat (Abridged) 2011 Jonaki  Prokashoni 
 Promoththo Prohor  (2008) Chayan Prokashan
 Ei Poth Ei Prem  (2011) Shamachar Publications
 Orao Kaaj Kore (2011) Koly Prokashoni

Awards
 Bangladesh Lekhika Sangha Prize (1984)
 Qamar Mushtari Prize (1990)
 Rajshahi Lekhika Sangha  Literary Award (1993)
 National Archives and Library Best Book Prize  (1997)
 Nondini Literary Award (1999)
 Bangla Academy Literary Award (2006)
 Ananya Literary Award (2007)
 Bangladesh Children's Academy Award (2010)

References

1938 births
2020 deaths
People from Bardhaman
Bengali-language writers
Bengali novelists
Bangladeshi women novelists
Bangladeshi writers
Bangladeshi women's rights activists
Recipients of Bangla Academy Award
20th-century novelists
21st-century novelists
20th-century Bangladeshi writers
21st-century Bangladeshi writers
20th-century Bangladeshi women writers
21st-century Bangladeshi women writers
Women writers from West Bengal